Fritz Hemke (né Frederic John Borg Hemke; born 1967) is an American saxophonist based in South Dakota. He is the son of saxophonist Frederick L. Hemke.

Education
He studied saxophone while a student at New Trier Township High School in Winnetka, Illinois.

He received his bachelor and master of music degrees from Northwestern University.

Teaching career
Hemke is on the faculty of Northern State University in Aberdeen, South Dakota, where he is the Jazz Ensemble director and assistant professor of applied woodwinds, woodwind methods, instrumental techniques.

Prior to joining the faculty at Northern, he served for ten years as Director of Jazz Performance Studies and saxophone instructor at the University of Missouri in Columbia.

He has taught saxophone at the Bemidji Arts Camp in Bemidji, Minnesota.

Performing career
Hemke appeared as a soloist with the Wroclaw Philharmonic Orchestra and conductor Mariusz Smolij, where he premiered new music commissioned for him (Mark Engebretson's "Duo Concertante" for alto and tenor saxophones and orchestra.) He also premiered "Charlie's Dream Concerto", a piece for alto saxophone and orchestra by Marta Ptaszynska.

He has performed as a guest artist in many international venues including the International Festival of Music of Pará in Belém, Brazil.

He was a guest artist at the Athens International Jazz Festival and has taught as a visiting scholar in jazz at the Franz Liszt College of Music in Budapest, Hungary.

External links
Northern State University web page on Frederic Hemke

1967 births
American classical saxophonists
American male saxophonists
American jazz saxophonists
Living people
University of Missouri faculty
Northern State University faculty
New Trier High School alumni
Bienen School of Music alumni
21st-century American saxophonists
Jazz musicians from Illinois
Classical musicians from Illinois
21st-century American male musicians
American male jazz musicians